Cathy Racon-Bouzon (born 22 November 1976) is a French politician from En Marche. She served as the member of the National Assembly for Bouches-du-Rhône's 5th constituency, which includes the 4th arrondissement of Marseille as well as parts of its 5th and 6th arrondissements.

Political career
In parliament, Racon-Bouzon served as member of the Committee on Cultural Affairs and Education. In addition to her committee assignments, she was part of the French-American Parliamentary Friendship Group. In 2020, Racon-Bouzon joined En commun (EC), a group within LREM led by Barbara Pompili.

In the 2022 French legislative election, she was once again challenged by Hendrik Davi from La France Insoumise in the second round, but lost her seat.

Political positions
In July 2019, Racon-Bouzon decided not to align with her parliamentary group's majority and became of 52 LREM members who abstained from a vote on the French ratification of the European Union’s Comprehensive Economic and Trade Agreement (CETA) with Canada.

Other activities
 Centre Pompidou, Member of the Supervisory Board

References

Living people
Politicians from Marseille
Deputies of the 15th National Assembly of the French Fifth Republic
La République En Marche! politicians
Women members of the National Assembly (France)
21st-century French women politicians
1976 births
Members of Parliament for Bouches-du-Rhône